KIAA1211L is a protein that in humans is encoded by the KIAA1211L gene. It is highly expressed in the brain (Cerebral Cortex). Furthermore, it is localized to the microtubules and the centrosomes and is subcellularly located in the nucleus. Finally, KIAA1211L is associated with certain mental disorders and various cancers.

Gene 

KIAA1211L is a protein-coding gene. The table above presents the gene's alias, location, size and accession number.

mRNA 
There are 11 splice isoforms of the gene KIAA1211L. The validated isoform has 10 exons.

Protein 

The table above presents the protein's alias, size, and accession number. The KIAA1211L protein is proline rich and asparagine, isoleucine, phenylalanine, and tyrosine poor.

Domains and motifs 

The KIAA1211L protein has one domain called the DUF4592 motif and spans amino acids 131–239. This domain is highly conserved among the KIAA1211L orthologs. The DUF4592 motif is depicted in both the conceptual translation and schematic figures.

Post translational modifications 

KIAA1211L is phosphorylated at the Ser92 and Ser490 amino acids. The KIAA1211L protein is also predicted to have five different SUMOylation sites located at Lys134, Lys375, Lys866, Lys874, and Lys914. Both the phosphorylated sites and the SUMOylation sites are depicted in the conceptual translation and schematic figures.

Secondary structure 

The KIAA1211L protein predicted secondary structure is composed of 50% alpha helixes, 8.9% beta sheets, and 17.9% turns. The high number of turns is consistent with the fact that KIAA1211L is proline rich.

Subcellular location 

The KIAA1211L protein is predicted to be located in the nucleus. The orthologs, including the elephant shark, horse, rock dove, and chimp, are also predicted to be located in the nucleus. The nuclear location signal is located on amino acids 25-43 which is depicted in both the conceptual translation and schematic figures. . This signal is conserved throughout the orthologs. Additionally, this location (amino acids 24-43) is positively charged, probably due to the high amount of lysine at this location. Finally, it is predicted that KIAA1211L is mainly localized to the microtubules and centrosome and sometimes localized to the cytokinetic bridge.

Expression 
The gene is highly expressed in the brain (Cerebral Cortex). The KIAA1211L protein is located in many different tissue types, including the brain, the hippocampus, the lung, breast carcinoma, the islets of Langerhans, the pancreas, the kidney, and 38 other tissues. Additionally, it is expressed an average amount compared to other human proteins.

Regulation of transcription 
The promoter region of KIAA1211L is approximately 1340 base pairs with various predicted transcription factors. The glial cells missing homolog 1 and the oligodendrocyte lineage transcription factors are notable because KIAA1211L is highly expressed in the brain. Furthermore, the Estrogen-related receptor alpha is also a notable transcription factor due to KIAA1211L's low expression levels when estrogen receptors are knocked down. Furthermore, KIAA1211L is predicted to be SUMOylated. The 3' UTR of KIAA1211L is predicted to be a targeted by miRNA-132, which is depicted in the conceptual translation figure.

Function

Interacting proteins 
Glycogen Synthase Kinase 3 Beta (GSK3B)

GSK3B is a protein kinase that regulates transcription factors and microtubules. As such, it phosphorylates proteins, decreasing their ability to bind and stabilize microtubules. The proteins it phosphorylates are the principle components of neurofibrillary tangles in Alzheimer disease. The protein is needed for the establishment of neuronal polarity and axon outgrowth and phosphorylates proteins in neuroblastoma cells. Furthermore, it is associated with bipolar disease and is active in breast cancer cells.

As such, the predicted interaction between KIAA1211L and GSK3B is likely because KIAA1211L is highly expressed in the brain, associated with bipolar disorder and breast cancer, and is localized on the microtubules. The interaction between GSK3B and KIAA1211L was predicted using anti bait coimmunoprecipitation, pull down, tandem affinity purification, fluorescence polarization spectroscopy, protein kinases assay, two hybrid, and confocal microscopy experiments.

KIAA1211L protein is also predicted to interact with Alpha-synuclein (SNCA), E3 Ubiquitin-Protein Ligase Mdm2 (MDM2), Serine/Threonine-Protein Kinase PAK 1 (PAK 1), and DNA Replication Factor Cdt1 (CDT1).

Clinical significance 
KIAA1211L is associated with depression, bipolar disorder, and schizophrenia. Additionally, KIAA1211L is associated with various cancers including ovarian, breast, etc.

Homology

Paralogs 
KIAA1211 is the paralog to KIAA1211L. KIAA1211 is located on chromosome 4 and has 1233 amino acids. Its percent identity to KIAA1211L is 21%. The KIAA1211 has an ortholog in the bacteria Proteus vulgarism, indicating the paralog duplicated 4290 million years ago, before KIAA1211L.

Orthologs 
Below is the table of various KIAA1211L orthologs. It includes closely, intermediately, and distantly related orthologs. The most distant ortholog is the elephant shark, indicating KIAA1211L duplicated 473 MYA. The amino acids conserved among all the KIAA1211L orthologs are depicted in the conceptual translation.

Phylogeny 
The KIAA1211L gene is similar and conserved in mammals, birds, reptiles, amphibians, and fish. It is not conserved in bacteria, archaea, protists, plants, fungus, trichoplax, and invertebrates.

Citations 

Human proteins